The Mujeer supplication is an Islamic prayer or Dua said on the 13th, 14th, and 15th days of the month of Ramadan. Jibra'il (Gabriel) is said to have taught the prayer to Muhammad when he was praying at Maqam Ibrahim.

The Mujeer supplication text was mentioned in the books Balad al-Amin and Misbuh by Ibrahim ibn Ali A’meli Kafa’mi.

Content
The supplication praises Allah. The sentences are short and after two of them, a sentence meaning “give us refuge from the everlasting fire, O Giver Of Refuge” is repeated. The words "Subhaanaka" ("Glory be to You") and "Ta-aalayta" ("Exalted be You") are frequently used in the prayer.

Part of the Mujeer supplication and its English pronunciation and translation:

Pronunciation: subhaanaka yaa Allaaho ta-aalayta yaa rahmaano ajirnaa menan naare yaa mojeer
Translation: Glory be to You O Allah! Exalted be You O Beneficent! Give us refuge from the everlasting fire, O Giver Of Refuge!

Pronunciation: subhaanaka yaa raheemo ta-aalayta yaa kareem ajirnaa menan naare yaa mojeer
Translation: Glory be to You O Merciful! Exalted be You O Generous! Give us refuge from the everlasting fire, O Giver Of Refuge!

Purpose 
Muslims recite the Mujeer for absolution and to be saved from the fire of Akhirah. In the opinion of Ayatollah Mojtahedi everyone who reads the Du'a in the thirteenth, fourteenth, and fifteenth days of Ramadan will have their sins forgiven. Some Shia Muslims claim that saying the prayer "is also very effective for the cure of the sick, fulfillment of debts, acquisition of wealth and relief from sorrows."

See also 

 Du'a Kumayl
 Du'a Nudba
 Du'a al-Baha
 Supplication of Abu Hamza al-Thumali
 Jawshan Kabir
 Jawshan Saqeer
 Du'a al-Sabah

References 

Shia prayers
Salah terminology
Islamic terminology